John Peto (date of birth unknown – 22 February 1874) was an English cricketer.  Peto's batting style is unknown, though it is known he fielded as a wicket-keeper.  He was christened at Godalming, Surrey on 26 December 1810.

Peto made a single first-class appearance for Surrey against the Marylebone Cricket Club at The Oval in 1847.  He was dismissed in Surrey's first-innings total of 197 for 7 runs by William Hillyer, with the Marylebone Cricket Club making 91 all out in response to that total.  Forced to follow-on, the Marylebone Cricket Club made 216, with Peto taking his only stumping of the match when he stumped Samuel Dakin off the bowling of Nicholas Felix.  Chasing 110 for victory, Surrey were dismissed nine runs short of their target, with Peto ending the innings not out on 5.

He died at Guildford, Surrey on 22 February 1874. His brother William Peto also played first-class cricket.

References

External links
John Peto at ESPNcricinfo
John Peto at CricketArchive

1874 deaths
People from Godalming
English cricketers
Surrey cricketers
Year of birth unknown
Wicket-keepers